Sarcochilus weinthalii, commonly known as the blotched butterfly orchid, is a small epiphytic orchid endemic to eastern Australia. It has between three and seven thin, leathery, yellowish green leaves and up to twelve cream-coloured flowers with large purple or reddish blotches.

Description
The sepals and petals are elliptic to spatula-shaped and the flowers are sometimes cup-shaped. Flowering occurs between August and October.

Taxonomy and naming
Sarcochilus weinthalii was first formally described in 1904 by Frederick Manson Bailey and the description was published in the Queensland Agricultural Journal from a specimen collected near Toowoomba by Ferdinand August Weinthal. The specific epithet (weinthalii) honours the collector of the type specimen.

Distribution and habitat
The blotched butterfly orchid grows in forest and scrub in hilly between the Bunya Mountains in Queensland and the Richmond River in New South Wales.

Conservation
This orchid is classed as "vulnerable" under the Australian Government Environment Protection and Biodiversity Conservation Act 1999 and the New South Wales Government Biodiversity Conservation Act 2016. The main threats to the species are illegal collecting and inappropriate fire regimes.

References

Endemic orchids of Australia
Orchids of New South Wales
Orchids of Queensland
Plants described in 1904
weinthalii